The women's 10,000 metres at the 2004 Summer Olympics as part of the athletics program were held at the Athens Olympic Stadium on August 27. No preliminary rounds were held at this distance, since the number of competitors allowed a direct final.

Like Fernanda Ribeiro at the 2000 Summer Olympics, defending champion Derartu Tulu was not able to maintain her title, finishing in the third place behind compatriot (and cousin) Ejegayehu Dibaba and the winner Xing Huina. In Athens, Ribeiro did not finish the race due to fatigue, along with British marathon world record holder Paula Radcliffe.  Throughout the race, Xing marked the Ethiopian favorites, not taking the lead until the home stretch with a final kick Dibabba could not match.  Xing's final lap was just under 63 seconds.

Records
, the existing World and Olympic records were as follows.

No new records were set during the competition.

Qualification
The qualification period for athletics was 1 January 2003 to 9 August 2004. For the women's 5000 metres, each National Olympic Committee was permitted to enter up to three athletes that had run the race in 31:45.00 or faster during the qualification period. If an NOC had no athletes that qualified under that standard, one athlete that had run the race in 32:17.00 or faster could be entered.

Schedule
All times are Greece Standard Time (UTC+2)

Results

References

External links
 IAAF Athens 2004 Olympic Coverage

W
10,000 metres at the Olympics
2004 in women's athletics
Women's events at the 2004 Summer Olympics